Nancy Wheeler is a fictional character from the Netflix television show Stranger Things, portrayed by Natalia Dyer. Nancy is the sister of Mike Wheeler, the girlfriend of Jonathan Byers, and the ex-girlfriend of Steve Harrington. Nancy starts investigating the disappearance of Will Byers when her friend Barbara Holland goes missing as well. She teams up with her future boyfriend Jonathan Byers to investigate Will and Barbara's disappearance, which leads to her discovery of the Upside Down, an alternate dimension.

Nancy is also a playable character in the 2016 horror-themed video game Dead by Daylight.

Portrayal 
In an interview for Cosmopolitan, Natalia Dyer reveals that she auditioned for the role twice and first thought she "bombed" the initial audition.

Fictional character biography

Season 1 

Nancy is Ted and Karen Wheeler's oldest child. She has a younger brother, Mike, and younger sister, Holly. She is introduced as best friends with Barbara Holland, who doesn't agree with Nancy's new relationship with Steve Harrington. She is also shown to have grown somewhat distant from her brother and his friends, and is unaware of Jonathan's secret feelings for her. After Will goes missing, Nancy offers her sentiments to Jonathan, something which distances herself from Steve's other friends, who think Jonathan is a freak and is likely responsible for Will's disappearance. Nancy becomes involved in the investigation after Barbara disappears while Nancy is having sex with Steve. Due to her guilt for abandoning Barbara and her motivation to find out what happened to her friend, Nancy meets up with Jonathan to discuss Will and Barbara's disappearance.

In the course of their investigation, Jonathan and Nancy accidentally discover the alternate dimension where the creature that took Barbara – The Demogorgon – resides, known as "The Upside-Down". Nancy successfully escapes from The Upside-Down thanks to Jonathan's help and the two retreat back to Nancy's house, where they sleep in her bed to comfort each other. This is witnessed by Steve, who takes the encounter out of context and assumes Nancy is cheating on him. In a fit of rage, Steve's friends Tommy H. and Carol graffiti the Hawkins movie theater slut-shaming Nancy. Nancy confronts Steve, which results in a fight between Jonathan and Steve, leading to Jonathan's arrest. After Hopper gets a call from the station that Jonathan has been arrested, he and Joyce return to Hawkins where they share the information they know about The Demogorgon. Nancy successfully contacts Mike, who has gone into hiding due to having befriended Eleven and becoming a target of the Hawkins lab. Nancy reunites with Mike and his friends at Hawkins Middle School where they build a makeshift sensory deprivation tank for Eleven to be able to use to find Will and Barbara. Eleven discovers that Barbara has been killed by the Demogorgon, leading to Nancy cementing her determination to kill the monster.

Nancy and Jonathan return to the Byers house to create a distraction, to allow Joyce and Hopper safe passage through The Upside-Down to retrieve Will, luring the Demogorgon to the house with blood. Steve arrives in hopes of reconciling with Jonathan, but ends up becoming witness to The Demogorgon. Nancy and Jonathan ask Steve to leave and save himself, but he finds his courage due to his love for Nancy and re-enters the house, successfully injuring the Demogorgon before it is lured back to Hawkins Middle School, where it is seemingly killed by Eleven. Nancy reconciles with Steve and resumes their relationship, gifting Jonathan with a new camera for Christmas.
Jonathan first hesitates but takes the gift from Nancy though not telling the truth about his feelings for her.

Season 2 

One year after the events of season 1, Nancy and Steve have been consistently having dinners with Barb's parents. Barb's parents do not know that Barb is dead, and have hired a private investigator to look into her disappearance, financing the investigation by selling their house. The private investigator, Murray Bauman, is a bit of a conspiracy theorist, and is shown harassing Hopper for information and sharing his theories. Nancy is still overcome with grief over Barbara's death and begins showing potential signs of post-traumatic stress disorder, believing she is seeing Barbara's ghost following her in the school's library. While attending a Halloween party, Nancy gets drunk and begins verbally berating Steve when he tries to cut her off, leading to a falling out between the two. After Steve angrily leaves the party, she is escorted back home by Jonathan.

Nancy confides in Jonathan and the two arrange a meeting with Barb's mother in the park. At the park, Nancy and Jonathan are overcome with the suspicion they are being watched, and are intercepted by agents of the Hawkins Lab. They secretly record a conversation with Dr. Owens, who explains that he is trying to amend for Brenner's mistakes, admitting to culpability in Barbara's death.

Nancy and Jonathan visit Murray at his residence to see if the evidence is damning enough to lead to the shutdown of Hawkins Lab. Murray suggests that they water down the story to make it more believable to the public. He also figures out that Nancy and Jonathan have sexual tension, suggesting that they share his guest room, leading to them reciprocating their feelings that night.

Upon their return to Hawkins, Nancy and Jonathan find the Byers residence empty and littered with Will's drawings. They head to Hawkins Lab where they soon come across Steve, who has in the meanwhile befriended Dustin, Lucas and Max Mayfield. They head to the front gate where they meet Hopper, Joyce, Mike and a heavily sedated Will, who has become possessed by the Mind Flayer. They return to the Byers house and attempt to interrogate Will, who has been signaling in Morse Code for them to close the gate to The Upside Down. Once they deduce Will's message, the Byers house phone rings, alerting The Mind Flayer to their location. The house becomes swarmed with Demodogs before they are incapacitated by Eleven. The group reunites with Eleven and create a plan which involves Hopper and Eleven returning to Hawkins Lab for Eleven to close the gate, with Joyce and Jonathan going to Hopper's cabin to exorcise Will. Steve encourages Nancy to go with Jonathan and promises to look after Mike and the rest of the kids. With their differences put aside, Nancy accompanies Jonathan in exorcising Will, restraining him and exposing him to numerous heaters. Once the Mind Flayer has successfully exited Will's body, the group signals to Hopper to close the gate.

Nancy later attends the official funeral for Bob and Barbara after Hawkins Lab is exposed and shut down. Nancy and Jonathan volunteer help at the Hawkins Middle School Snow Ball, where she sees that Dustin is alone and rejected. Nancy offers to dance with Dustin and consoles him.

Season 3 

In the summer of 1985, Nancy and Jonathan get internships at The Hawkins Post under the watch of Tom Holloway. Nancy is eager to impress her sexist male bosses by suggesting story ideas, which usually resulted in demeaning jokes and comments, leaving Nancy humiliated. One night while Nancy is working late, she answers a call to about rats eating Doris Driscoll's fertilizer. Assuming the guise of reporters, Nancy and Jonathan interview Mrs. Driscoll at her house, where they witness a rabid rat she has captured. Nancy's colleagues reject the story calling Driscoll a "nut-job", leading to Nancy returning to the house, only to find that Mrs. Driscoll has become infected by the newly resurrected Mind Flayer, eating fertilizer and screaming that she "has to go back".

In the meanwhile, through possessing Billy Hargrove and Tom's daughter Heather, the Mind Flayer possesses Tom and the rest of the Hawkins Post staff, and compels them to fire Nancy and Jonathan to keep them from learning the truth. Still undeterred and despite an argument with Jonathan, Nancy still decides to pursue the story, noticing symptoms in Mrs. Driscoll similar to that of Will's possession, Nancy calls Jonathan and asks to meet up with Will. As they discuss this information, Nancy, Jonathan, Will, Mike, Eleven, Lucas and Max return to the hospital, only for Nancy and Jonathan to find that Mrs. Driscoll is missing and are intercepted by the flayed Tom and his co-worker Bruce. A fight breaks out, with Jonathan killing Tom while Nancy kills Bruce, before the two flayed hosts merge to form a monster. The monster is wounded by Eleven before retreating to the sewers.

The group takes refuge at Hopper's cabin, but the Mind Flayer manages to track them down and wounds Eleven. The group heads to Starcourt Mall to re-group with Dustin, Steve, Steve's co-worker Robin and Lucas' sister Erica. While there, Hopper, Joyce and Murray arrive who reveal that they know how to close the new opening to the Upside-Down built by a Soviet detachment under the Starcourt Mall. The Mind Flayer arrives at the mall and is fended off with fireworks by Nancy, Jonathan, Will, Lucas, Steve and Robin, as Billy attempts to infect Eleven. Eleven reaches through to Billy, who sacrifices himself to The Mind Flayer to save Eleven, resulting in his death. The gate is eventually closed by Joyce, albeit seemingly at the cost of Hopper's life. After Hopper's "death", Joyce takes in Eleven and her, Will and Jonathan sell their house and move away. Nancy and Jonathan share a passionate and emotional kiss goodbye as she watches with her brother, Dustin, Lucas and Max as they leave Hawkins.

Season 4 

In the spring of 1986, Nancy is preparing for college and works for the school newspaper alongside her friend Fred Benson, while Jonathan lives in California with Joyce, Will and Eleven, afraid to tell Nancy that he has committed to a local community college to stay close to his family. After cheerleader Chrissy Cunningham is found brutally murdered inside the trailer of student Eddie Munson, Nancy and Fred go to the trailer park to investigate; Nancy interviews Eddie's uncle, who blames Chrissy's murder on Victor Creel, a man who was placed in a psychiatric institution after allegedly killing his family in the 1950s. Fred, meanwhile, is possessed and killed by the same demonic entity that killed Chrissy - whom the gang later dubs "Vecna". 

Nancy and Robin con their way into obtaining an interview with Creel at the Pennhurst asylum; he maintains that his family was killed by a demon, who they believe to be Vecna. Max is soon possessed by Vecna; Nancy and Robin recall that Creel himself was not possessed during his family's death - perhaps because music was playing on the stereo - and relay this to Dustin, Lucas, and Steve, who help Max successfully escape Vecna's control by playing her favorite song on her headphones.

Max recounts traveling to a hellish altar inside Vecna's mind, which she illustrates for the group. Nancy recognizes from the drawings that Vecna's lair is composed of detached fragments of the Creel residence, leading the group to investigate the now-abandoned house. Inside, the encounter flickering lights which they trace to Vecna's movements in the Upside Down. The lights suddenly begin to burst, corresponding to Vecna's murder of basketball player Patrick McKinney.

After Dustin notices his compass misbehaving, the gang realizes there must be a new gate to the Upside Down nearby, and trace it to Lover's Lake. Steve dives down to investigate but is yanked into the Upside Down by a tendril. Nancy, Robin and Eddie dive down after him and save him from a swarm of bat-like creatures. The group surmises that Vecna spawned a gate at the site of each murder, and indeed locate another gate inside Eddie's trailer where Chrissy died. Robin and Eddie escape the Upside Down while Nancy is possessed by Vecna. She is shown glimpses of his past that reveal him to be Henry Creel, Victor's son who killed his mother and sister using his telepathic powers, and was then placed in the care of Dr. Brenner, who attempted to replicate his powers in other children (including Eleven). Vecna then shows Nancy a vision of the future, where Hawkins is torn apart by rifts, before releasing her.

A traumatized Nancy relays Vecna's vision to the rest of the group, who resolve to kill Vecna that night. Max volunteers to bait Vecna into possessing her again, so that the others can kill him while he is distracted. She, Lucas and Erica go to the Creel house to summon Vecna while Nancy goes with Steve and Robin to the house's Upside Down counterpart to kill him. While traveling through the Upside Down, Steve admits to Nancy that he still harbors feelings for her. The group finds Vecna inside the Creel house and set him ablaze using Molotov cocktails while Nancy shoots him with a sawed-off shotgun, apparently killing him. However, Vecna had managed to briefly kill Max before being overpowered, allowing all four gates to open and tear through Hawkins.

Two days later, the town recovers from an "earthquake", while Max is comatose, having been revived by Eleven. Everyone reunites in Hawkins; Nancy and Jonathan choose not to discuss the problems in their relationship. Will senses Vecna is still alive, and the group notices the Upside Down beginning to infiltrate the town.

Reception 

The portrayal of Nancy by Natalia Dyer has received a very positive critical reception. Nancy's transition from an ordinary teenage girl to a brave and determined young woman was a character arc that many fans and critics responded positively to.

Nancy's storyline in season 3 was seen by many as The Duffer Brothers' take on workplace sexism and sexual harassment, and how Nancy overcame the humiliation. This storyline was seen as a positive example on how to tackle contemporary social issues in fiction, but the resolution for this storyline was seen by some as being rather anticlimactic.

Nancy's relationship with Jonathan Byers has also been seen by fans and critics as a strong point in the series, and their progression into a romantic couple was seen as being well-deserved. Critics and fans have also noticed how well the two work together, and the chemistry between Dyer and Charlie Heaton, who began dating in real life between production of seasons 1 and 2.

Nancy has also been seen as The Duffer Brothers's commentary on final girls in horror franchises from the 1980s. In particular, Nancy has been compared mostly to Nancy Thompson from A Nightmare on Elm Street, the namesake for the character.

The character, along with Steve Harrington, appears in the survival-horror videogame Dead by Daylight as a survivor as part of a Stranger Things pack, being hunted by the Demogorgon throughout Hawkins Lab.

References 

American female characters in television
Fictional characters from Indiana
Fictional high school students
Horror television characters
Science fiction television characters
Stranger Things characters
Teenage characters in television
Television characters introduced in 2016
Fictional reporters